A list of films produced in South Korea in 1968:

References

External links
1968 in South Korea

 1960-1969 at koreanfilm.org

South Korea
1968
Films